The 1999–2000 season are the Esteghlal Football Club's 8th season in the Azadegan League, and their 6th consecutive season in the top division of Iranian football. They are also competing in the Hazfi Cup and Asian Cup Winners' Cup, and 55th year in existence as a football club.

Player
As of 1 September 1999.

Pre-season and friendlies

Competitions

Overview

Azadegan League

Standings

Results summary

Results by round

Matches

Hazfi Cup

Round of 16

1/8 finals

Quarterfinals

Semifinal

Final

Asian Cup Winners' Cup

First round

Second round

See also
 1999–2000 Azadegan League
 1999–2000 Hazfi Cup
 1999–2000 Asian Cup Winners' Cup

References

External links
 RSSSF

1999–2000
Esteghlal